Kirk Lynn (born May 8, 1972) is a playwright and novelist who lives in Austin, Texas. He graduated from Douglas MacArthur High School in San Antonio, Texas in 1990.  He is one of the founders of Rude Mechanicals theater company and he has been working with this collaborative theater company since 1996.  He published his first novel, Rules for Werewolves, in 2015.

In 2011, he was named one of the United States Artists Jeanne and Michael Klein Fellows for the category of Theater Arts.

Lynn is head of Playwriting and Directing in the Department of Theatre and Dance at the University of Texas at Austin.

He is married to the poet Carrie Fountain.

Plays 

2009

The Wrestling Patient (co-written with Anne Gottlieb and Katie Pearl) 
Produced by Speakeasy Productions 
Directed by Katie Pearl
Premiered at Boston Center for the Arts Roberts Studio Theatre, March 27 - April 11, 2009

2006

Decameron Day 7: Revenge
directed by Shawn Sides • created by Rude Mechs
April/May 2006 The Off Center (Austin, TX)

2004

Cherrywood: the modern comparable
directed by Shawn Sides • created by Rude Mechs
October/November 2004 The Off Center (Austin, TX)
June 2005 National Ensemble Theatre Festival (Blue Lake, CA)

2003

How late it was, how late
adapted from the Booker Prize–winning novel by James Kelman
directed by Sarah Richardson • created by Rude Mechs
September 2003 The Off Center (Austin, TX)

2002

El Paraiso
directed by Shawn Sides • created by Rude Mechs
April/May 2002 The Off Center (Austin, TX)

2001

Requiem for Tesla
directed by Shawn Sides • created by Rude Mechs
January/Feb 2001 The Off Center (Austin, TX)
February 2003 Fresh Terrain Festival (Austin, TX)

1998

¡Gringo! (a Frontera Fest production)
written by José Hernández and Kirk Lynn • directed by Catherine Glynn
February 1998 Hyde Park Theater

Crucks (Part II of the Faminly Trilogy)
directed by Shawn Sides
July/August 1998 Public Domain

Salivation (Part III of the Faminly Trilogy)
directed by Gavin Mundy
November 1998 Hyde Park Theater
September 2004 Philadelphia Live Arts Festival (Philadelphia, PA)

References

1972 births
21st-century American dramatists and playwrights
Living people
Douglas MacArthur High School (San Antonio) alumni